Anelosimus oritoyacu is a species of tangle-web spider found in Ecuador and Mexico at altitudes from .  It is subsocial, although it has some features which distinguish it from other social or subsocial spiders in the genus.  It has long-lived nest sites, unlike the social spider Anelosimus eximius which has more transitory nest sites, and its webs do not have aerial threads found in other social and sub-social species.  It has a female-biased sex ratio, which is indicative of social behavior, although its sex ratio is smaller than other social species.  It was first identified as distinct from Anelosimus studiosus in 2006 by Ingi Agnarsson.  It is named for Oritoyacu, Ecuador, where the type specimen was collected.

Description 
Specimens collected in Mexico are larger. Prosoma is brown with grey marks, while legs are pale brown, with darker brown at the tips. Males can be distinguished by the size of their embolus fork and embolus division b, while females have an epigynal plate which is high relative to its width.

Distribution 
All specimens collected have come from either Mexico or Ecuador, and the specimens collected in Mexico are uncertain in their assignment to this species. Elevation appears to play a role in sociality within the Anelosimus genus, so the high elevation has been implicated as potentially explanatory of the unusually low sex ratio and other peculiarities of this species.

References 

Theridiidae
Spiders of Mexico
Spiders of South America
Spiders described in 2006